Irdynivka is a rural settlement in Cherkasy Raion of Cherkasy Oblast (province) in central Ukraine. It belongs to Bilozirya rural hromada, one of the hromadas of Ukraine. The settlement consists of only a small number of buildings and streets, and as of 2001 the population totalled 39 residents.

Irdynivka was subordinated under the  Bilozirya village council until 1985, following a transfer to the Smila city council which lasted until 18 July 2020. On this date, Smila was incorporated as a town of oblast significance and thereafter did not belong to any raion. In July 2020, as part of the administrative reform of Ukraine which reduced the number of raions of Cherkasy Oblast to four, the town of Smila (and thus Irdynivka) was merged into the Cherkasy Raion.

The settlement has no amenities and the nearest ones are located in nearby Smila, or on Highway H16. There is a single bus route servicing the area and a railway crossing is located on the outskirts, but no station exists. The River Irdyn, an offshoot of the Tiasmyn, flows south-west of Irdynivka. The name of the settlement most likely comes from the Ukrainisation of the German suffix -Hof ('courtyard'), perhaps following Polonization to -ówka, to Ukrainian -ivka, which is supported by the existence of nearby Irdyn and the river of the same name.

Political representation is managed as part of Smila city council and the current mayor is Ananko Sergey Vasilyevich.

Climate 
Similar to the surrounding regions, Irdynivka has a temperate climate with 'significant' levels of precipitation.

References

Rural settlements in Cherkasy Oblast